Astrakan Café is an album by Tunisian oud player Anouar Brahem recorded in 1999 and released on the ECM label.

Reception 
The Allmusic review by Thom Jurek called it "deeply personal, profound music. It is also highly iconographic, with timelessness woven through every measure... This would be traditional music if a tradition such as this -- which is original, though adapted from many sources on inspiration -- actually existed. Highly recommended "

Track listing
All compositions by Anouar Brahem except as indicated
 "Aube Rouge à Grozny" (Barbaros Erköse) - 4:22 
 "Astrakan Café Part 1" - 3:18 
 "The Mozdok's Train" - 4:46 
 "Blue Jewels" - 8:31 
 "Nihawend Lunga" (Cemil Bey) - 3:32 
 "Ashkabad" (Anouar Brahem, Barbaros Erköse, Lassad Hosni) - 5:38 
 "Halfaouine" - 5:57 
 "Parfum de Gitane" - 7:03 
 "Khotan" - 3:31 
 "Karakoum" - 5:08 
 "Astara" - 10:46 
 "Dar Es Salam" - 3:47 
 "Hijaz Pechref" (Brahem, Osman Bey Fragment) - 6:24 
 "Astrakan Café Part 2" - 4:49 
Recorded at Monastery of St Gerold in Austria in June 1999

Personnel
Anouar Brahem - oud
Barbaros Erköse - clarinet 
Lassad Hosni - bendir, darbouka

References 

2000 albums
ECM Records albums
Anouar Brahem albums
Albums produced by Manfred Eicher